Pisiffik A/S is a chain of Greenlandic stores. The company is the largest privately owned commercial company in Greenland, and is a subsidiary jointly owned by NorgesGruppen, the Norwegian grocery wholesaling group, the Danish investment company KFI, and Greenland Venture, a state-owned investment firm.

History 
Pisiffik was first established in 1993 as KNI Pisiffik A/S, a subsidiary of Greenland's KNI conglomerate. Based in Greenland's larger towns, it was an experiment in running the stores without a government subsidy, while KNI Pilersuisoq continued to operate the more distant and less profitable outposts. The present Pisiffik A/S was spun off as a separate company in 2001 when Danish company Dagrofa bought Pisiffik as part of a privatization of parts of KNI. Dagrofa sold its shares to the current owners in 2015. In 2016, the headquarters were moved from Sisimiut to Nuuk.

Operations 

Pisiffik's approximately 40 stores are found in the six largest towns in Greenland: Aasiaat, Ilulissat, Maniitsoq, Nuuk, Qaqortoq, and Sisimiut.

Brands 
Pisiffik A/S includes the following brands:
 Pisiffik - Supermarkets
 SPAR - Grocery stores
 Akiki - Discount store
 Pisattat - Consumer electronics stores
 Torrak Fashion - Clothing stores
 JYSK - Furniture stores
 Elgiganten - Consumer electronics stores
 Nota Bene - Consumer electronics store in Nuuk
 SuKu - Home decor stores

Pisiffik also owns wholesaler KK Engros.

References

Companies based in Nuuk
Greenland